Heroes is a 2010 Spanish drama film directed by , who also co-wrote it alongside Albert Espinosa. It stars Eva Santolaria, Alex Brendemühl and Emma Suárez alongside Nerea Camacho and Lluís Homar.

Plot 
The plot concerns a journey back to childhood (during the Summer of 1984) by means of a flashback brought by the memories of a disenchanted publicist (Sala) upon meeting with Cristina, that runs parallel to the subplot in the present time.

Cast

Production 
The film is a Media Films and Televisió de Catalunya production. Shooting locations included Palamós, the Sau Reservoir, Gavà, and Dosrius. It was shot primarily in Catalan.

Release 
The film premiered at the 13th Málaga Film Festival's official selection on 22 April 2010. It was theatrically released in Spain on 22 October 2010.

Reception 
Mirito Torreiro of Fotogramas rated the film 3 out of 5 stars, highlighting "the clarity (and ability) with which it seeks its audience", while citing its certain sappiness as a negative point.

Andrea G. Bermejo of Cinemanía rated it 4 out of 5 stars, welcoming a Spanish film taking a deep dive into a childhood that is neither marginal nor traumatic.

Jordi Costa of El País wrote that even if Freixas and Espinosa's work dives into sheer cliché and cheesiness, it ends up emerging as "a solid commercial product".

Accolades 

|-
| rowspan = "2" align = "center" | 2010 || rowspan = "2" | 13rd Málaga Film Festival || colspan = "2" | Silver Biznaga for Audience Award ||  || rowspan = "2" | 
|-
| Best Costume Design || Nuria Anglada || 
|-
| rowspan = "14" align = "center" | 2011 
| rowspan = "10" | 3rd Gaudí Awards || colspan = "2" | Best Catalan-language Film ||  || rowspan = "10" | 
|-
| Best Director || Pau Freixas || 
|-
| Best Screenplay || Albert Espinosa, Pau Freixas || 
|-
| Best Production Supervision || Inés Font || 
|-
| Best Art Direction || Joan Sabaté || 
|-
| Best Supporting Actor || Lluís Homar || 
|-
| Best Editing || Jaume Martí || 
|-
| Best Original Score || Arnau Bataller || 
|-
| Best Cinematography || Julián Elizalde || 
|-
| Best Sound || Ferran Mengod, Marc Orts, Marisol Nievas || 
|-
| rowspan = "4" | 66th CEC Medals || colspan = "2" | Best Film ||  || align = "center" rowspan = "4" | 
|-
| Best Supporting Actress || Eva Santolaria || 
|-
| Best Supporting Actor || Alex Brendemühl || 
|-
| Best Original Screenplay || Albert Espinosa, Pau Freixas || 
|}

See also 
 List of Spanish films of 2010

References 

2010s Catalan-language films
Spanish drama films
2010 drama films
Films set in 1984
Films shot in the province of Girona
Films shot in the province of Barcelona
2010s Spanish films